Prohibition is a 2011 American television documentary miniseries directed by Ken Burns and Lynn Novick with narration by Peter Coyote. The series originally aired on PBS between October 2, 2011 and October 4, 2011. It was funded in part by the National Endowment for the Humanities. It draws heavily from the 2010 book Last Call: The Rise and Fall of Prohibition by Daniel Okrent.

Synopsis
Prohibition describes how the consumption and effect of alcoholic beverages in the United States were connected to many different cultural forces including immigration, women's suffrage, and the income tax. Eventually the Temperance movement led to the passing of Prohibition, the 18th Amendment to the U.S. Constitution. Widespread defiance of the law, uneven and unpopular enforcement, and violent crime associated with the illegal trade in alcohol caused increasing dissatisfaction with the amendment, eventually leading to its repeal 13 years later.

Episodes
 "A Nation of Drunkards" (1 hr 34 min) describes how immigration, alcoholism, women's suffrage and the temperance movements led up to the passing of the 18th Amendment, Prohibition.
 "A Nation of Scofflaws" (1 hr 50 min) addresses how the enforcement of Prohibition was inconsistent and caused unintended consequences, including making criminals of a large portion of the population.
 "A Nation of Hypocrites" (1 hr 45 min) follows the gradual swing towards repeal of Prohibition as the Great Depression focuses attention on other priorities.

Cast

Voice actors

Adam Arkin
Philip Bosco
Patricia Clarkson (Carrie Nation) 
Kevin Conway
Peter Coyote (narrator)
Blythe Danner
Paul Giamatti (George Remus) 
Tom Hanks (Newspaper, Roy Olmstead)
Jeremy Irons
Samuel L. Jackson
John Lithgow (H. L. Mencken) 
Josh Lucas
Amy Madigan
Carolyn McCormick
Oliver Platt (Al Capone)
Campbell Scott (F. Scott Fitzgerald)
Frances Sternhagen
Joanne Tucker
Sam Waterston (newspaper)

Interviewed consultants

Zeke Alpern
Jonathan Eig
Noah Feldman
Pete Hamill
Edwin T. Hunt Jr
Michael Lerner
William Leuchtenburg
Martin E. Marty
Catherine Gilbert Murdock
Daniel Okrent
Ruth P. Smith
John Paul Stevens
Margot Loines Wilkie
Joshua M. Zeitz

Critical response
"You can hear history talking directly to the Americans of 2011 all through 'Prohibition,' an absorbing five-and-a-half-hour documentary by Ken Burns and Lynn Novick ... Especially now, the story of America's disastrous experiment with banning alcoholic beverages seems made for Santayana's phrase about learning from the past or being condemned to repeat it."Neil Genzlinger, New York Times
"Burns has the similar gift of that rare history professor who can captivate even the most reluctant student by bringing the material to life."Hank Stuever, Washington Post
"Prohibition provides a very fine analytic survey of the noble experiment."Troy Patterson, Slate
"Another piece of wonder by Ken Burns."Tim Goodman, Hollywood Reporter

References

External links
PBS: Prohibition
Florentine Films

2011 in American television
2010s American documentary television series
2010s American television miniseries
PBS original programming
Works about prohibition in the United States